Breaking News may refer to:

 Breaking news, an interruption of scheduled programming in order to report the latest details of a current event
 Breaking News (horse), an American Saddlebred show horse

Film and television
 Breaking News (2004 film), a Hong Kong film directed by Johnnie To
 Breaking News (2012 film), a Kannada film by Nagathihalli Chandrashekar
 Breaking News (TV series), a 2002 American drama series
 Breaking News, the title that Australian TV series Frontline was known as when it aired on PBS in the United States
 Breaking News Network, a US-based subscription news-alerts service

Music
 Breaking News (album), by Samini, 2015
 "Breaking News" (song), by Michael Jackson, 2010
 "Breaking News", a song by Half Man Half Biscuit from Cammell Laird Social Club, 2002
 "Breaking News", a song by Shinee from Boys Meet U, 2013

See also 
 Breaking the News, a 1912 Australian film directed by W. J. Lincoln
 Breaking the News (painting), an 1887 painting by John Longstaff
 Broken News, a 2005 British satirical comedy series
 "Toronto's breaking news", a slogan used by the television news channel CP24